Ingibiorg Finnsdottir (normalised Old Norse:) was a daughter of Earl Finn Arnesson and Bergljot Halvdansdottir. She was also a niece of Kings Olaf II and Harald Hardrada of Norway. She is also known as Ingibiorg, the Earls'-Mother. The dates of her life are not known with certainty.

She married Earl Thorfinn Sigurdsson of Orkney. The Orkneyinga Saga claims that Kalf Arnesson, Ingibiorg's uncle, was exiled in Orkney after her marriage to Thorfinn. This was during the reign of Magnus the Good, son of Olaf II, who ruled from 1035 to 1047, and probably before the death of Harthacanute in 1042. Thorfinn and Ingibiorg had two known sons, Paul and Erlend Thorfinnsson, who jointly ruled as earls of Orkney. Both also fought in Harald Hardraade's ill-fated invasion of the Kingdom of England in 1066.

Ingibiorg remarried after Thorfinn's death (actual date unknown)  Her second husband was King Malcolm III of Scotland. Whatever the exact date of the marriage, Malcolm and Ingibiorg had at least one son, and probably two. The Orkneyinga Saga tells us that Duncan II was their son, and it is presumed that the "Domnall son of Máel Coluim, King of Scotland" whose death in 1085 is reported by the Annals of Ulster was also their son.

Ingibiorg is presumed to have died in around 1069 as Malcolm married Margaret, sister of Edgar Ætheling, in about 1070. If Ingibiorg was never queen, it would help to explain the apparent ignorance of her existence displayed by some Scots chroniclers.

Notes

References

 Anon., Orkneyinga Saga: The History of the Earls of Orkney, tr. Hermann Pálsson and Paul Edwards. Penguin, London, 1978. 
 Duncan, A.A.M., The Kingship of the Scots 842–1292: Succession and Independence. Edinburgh University Press, Edinburgh, 2002. 
 Oram, Richard, David I: The King Who Made Scotland. Tempus, Stroud, 2004. 
 Snorri Sturluson, Heimskringla: History of the Kings of Norway, tr. Lee M. Hollander. Reprinted University of Texas Press, Austin, 1992.

External links
 Heimskringla  at World Wide School
 Orkneyinga Saga at Northvegr

1069 deaths
Scottish royal consorts
Year of birth unknown
11th-century Scottish people
11th-century Normans
11th-century Scottish women
11th-century Norwegian nobility
11th-century Norwegian women
11th-century Norman women